Cathryn Lee Damon (September 11, 1930 – May 4, 1987) was an American actress known for her roles in sitcoms in the 1970s and 1980s. She was best known as Mary Campbell in Soap, for which she was nominated three times for the Primetime Emmy Award for Outstanding Lead Actress in a Comedy Series, winning in 1980.

Early years
Damon was the elder daughter of Lee Frank Damon and Mary Cathryn Atwood. Her parents divorced and her mother married Walter A. Springer. 

Damon was born in Seattle and raised in Tacoma and graduated from Stadium High School. As a child, she felt insecure, saying: "I never thought I was attractive enough. I never thought I was good enough." She also felt as a child she was responsible for her parents' divorce. She moved to New York City at age 16 to pursue ballet.

Career 
Damon began her career as a ballerina, dancing in the Jacob's Pillow Dance Festival in Lee, Massachusetts, and performing with the Metropolitan Opera's dance company.

Off-Broadway plays in which Damon appeared included The Boys From Syracuse. and The Secret Life of Walter Mitty.
She appeared in several Broadway productions, including Shinbone Alley; Foxy; Flora, The Red Menace; The Boys from Syracuse; The Last of the Red Hot Lovers; Sweet Bird of Youth; and The Cherry Orchard. During the 1967-68 season, she understudied the roles of both Mame Dennis and Vera Charles in Angela Lansbury's national tour of Mame.

Damon became familiar to television viewers as middle-class Mary Campbell on the primetime spoof of daytime soap operas aptly entitled Soap from 1977-81. However, many fans may not know that she was the third and final actress cast in the role. Producer Tony Thomas said, "Cathryn Damon was brilliant. A lot of people don't know this, but we recast that to put her in it." She later appeared with Soap co-star Eugene Roche on Webster from 1984-86. The pair played Cassie and Bill Parker, Webster's landlords, on the hit series. Other television credits included guest roles on The Love Boat, Fantasy Island, Murder, She Wrote, Matlock, and Mike Hammer.

Damon, along with costar and TV husband Richard Mulligan, won an Emmy Award for Soap in 1980 but could not appear in person to receive the award in person or give her speech, owing to an actors' strike. Mulligan referred to his late co-star (whom he affectionately called "Toots") and her strike-related absence when he received his second Best Actor Emmy more than a decade later for his role as Dr. Weston on the television series Empty Nest.

Personal life 
In August 1953, Damon married Richard Price Towers, an actor and singer, in New York City.

Illness and death
In 1986, Damon was diagnosed with ovarian cancer, but continued acting in small roles up until shortly before her death a year later at age 56, on May 4, 1987. She died in Los Angeles at Cedars-Sinai Medical Center.

Her final role, as Elizabeth McGovern's mother in the movie She's Having a Baby with Kevin Bacon, was released posthumously. She is interred in Acacia Memorial Park near Seattle.

Filmography

Film

Television

References

External links

1930 births
1987 deaths
20th-century American actresses
20th-century American singers
Actresses from Seattle
Actresses from Tacoma, Washington
American film actresses
American stage actresses
American television actresses
Deaths from cancer in California
Deaths from ovarian cancer
Outstanding Performance by a Lead Actress in a Comedy Series Primetime Emmy Award winners
20th-century American women singers